"The Knapsack, the Hat, and the Horn" is a German fairy tale by the Brothers Grimm and is numbered KHM 54. It is Aarne–Thompson type 569.

Synopsis

Three brothers set out to seek their fortunes. The first finds silver, the second finds gold, and the third acquires a variety of magical objects. These objects include a knapsack that summons soldiers, a hat that fires bullets, and a horn that can destroy cities. By the use of these items, he marries a princess and becomes the ruler of a nation.

This fairy tale has also been given the alternate title "The Fortune Seekers".

References

External links

Grimms' Fairy Tales